Mohammad Taha Nematian (born 8 February 1995) is an Iranian professional futsal player. He is currently a member of Naft Al Wasat in the Iraq Futsal League.

Honours

Club 
 Azerbaijan Futsal Premier League
 Champion (1): 2018–19 (Araz Naxçivan)
 Iran Futsal's 1st Division
 Champion (1): 2016–17 (Moghavemat Qarchak)

International goals

References

1995 births
Living people
People from Qom
Iranian men's futsal players
Futsal forwards
Almas Shahr Qom FSC players
Ana Sanat FC players
Araz Naxçivan players
Sunich FSC players
Iranian expatriate futsal players
Iranian expatriate sportspeople in Azerbaijan
Iranian expatriate sportspeople in Iraq